First Love is a South Korean television series starring Bae Yong-joon, Choi Soo-jong and Lee Seung-yeon. It aired on KBS2 from September 7, 1996 to April 20, 1997 on Saturday and Sunday at 19:55 for 66 episodes.

It is currently the second highest-rated Korean drama of all time, based on single episode viewership ratings, reaching 65.8% on its final broadcast on April 20, 1997. Its average rating for its entire run was 52.6%. In 1997, the series aired on China Central Television to commercial success and is widely considered the beginning of the Korean Wave.

Plot

Brothers Sung Chan-woo and Sung Chan-hyuk and their sister Sung Chan-ok live in the poor countryside outside with their father Sung Duk-bae, trying to get by as a farming family. 

The stern and hard-working Chan Woo and his older brother Chan Hyuk, an aspiring artist, are both in love with Hyo-kyung. She returns Chan-hyuk 's affection. After learning the two are dating, Chan-woo finds it hard to be around her, though she tries to continue to be friendly with him. Lee Jae-ha (Jo Kyung Hwan), Hyo Kyeong's gangster father, is against her dating a poor artist. 

A mysterious accident leaves Chan-hyuk paralyzed. Chan-woo, now a law student, gives up his career and joins the underground world of the mafia to seek revenge on Hyo Kyung's family for his own family's suffering.

As the series progresses, Chan-woo is still in love with Hyo-kyung and is torn between his love, the loyalty to his brother and desire for revenge. As the paralyzed Chan-hyuk grows distant to Hyo-kyung, she became drawn to Chan-woo. There was also the childhood friend Kang Suk-hee with a crush on Chan-woo.

Cast
 Bae Yong-joon as Sung Chan-woo
 Choi Soo-jong as Sung Chan-hyuk 
 Lee Seung-yeon as Lee Hyo-kyung
 Song Chae-hwan as Sung Chan-ok (Chan-hyuk and Chan-woo's sister)
 Choi Ji-woo as Kang Suk-hee 
 Park Sang-won as Kang Suk-jin (Suk-hee's brother)
 Lee Hye-young as Park Shin-ja
 Son Hyun-joo as Ju Jung-nam (guitarist)
 Bae Do-hwan as Oh Dong-pal
 Jo Kyung-hwan as Lee Jae-ha (Hyo-kyung's father)
 Yoon Mi-ra as Hyo-kyung's mother
 Kim In-moon as Sung Duk-bae (Chan-woo's father)
 Jeon Yang-ja as Chairman Jun (Suk-jin's mother)
 Park Jung-soo as Shin-ja's mother
 Kim Tae-woo as Park Hyung-ki (Chan-woo's classmate)
 Song Hye-kyo as one of the students being tutored by Hyo-kyung
 Cha Tae-hyun as Chan-woo's friend

International broadcast
Due to Bae Yong-joon's popularity post-Winter Sonata, First Love was aired in Japan on NHK in 2005.

See also
 List of Korean television shows
 Contemporary culture of South Korea

References

External links
 

Korean Broadcasting System television dramas
1996 South Korean television series debuts
1997 South Korean television series endings
South Korean romance television series
1990s romance television series
1990s South Korean television series